Gerardia may refer to:
 Gerardia L., a plant genus now a synonym of Stenandrium Nees in family Acanthaceae
 Gerardia Benth., a plant genus now a synonym of Agalinis Raf. in family Orobanchaceae
 Gerardia Lacaze-Duthiers, 1864, a genus of cnidarians, now a synonym of Savalia Nardo, 1844
 Common names of several species of Agalinis Raf. formerly in Gerardia Benth., including:
 Agalinis acuta
 Agalinis auriculata
 Agalinis purpurea
 Agalinis skinneriana
 Agalinis tenuifolia